Littlerock is a 2010 film directed by Mike Ott. It debuted at the 2010 San Francisco International Film Festival, and played at over 40 film festivals including AFI Fest, Viennale, Cairo International Film Festival, Warsaw International Film Festival, Reykjavik International Film Festival, Thessaloniki International Film Festival, and Hong Kong International Film Festival before its U.S. theatrical release on August 12, 2011.

Plot
While on a trip to the United States, a Japanese brother and sister are momentarily stranded in the small Southern California town of Littlerock. As the brother decides to go forward with the trip, his sister, who speaks no English at all, chooses to stay on for a while and get to know some of the local residents.

Cast
 Atsuko Okatsuka as Atsuko Sakamoto 
 Cory Zacharia as Cory Lawler
 Rintaro Sawamoto as Rintaro Sakamoto 
 Roberto 'Sanz' Sanchez as Francisco Fumero
 Ryan Dillon as Brody
 Matthew Fling as Garbo
 Brett L. Tinnes as Jordan
 Markiss McFadden as Marques Wright 
 Sean Neff as Sean Tippy

Reception
The film was generally well received by critics. On Rotten Tomatoes it has an approval rating of 80% based on 25 reviews.

Awards

Won

AFI Fest
 Best Feature Film (Audience Award)

Gotham Awards
 Best Film Not Playing at a Theater Near You

Independent Spirit Awards
 Someone to Watch Award - Mike Ott

Reykjavik International Film Festival
 Audience Award

Independent Film Festival of Boston
 Grand Jury Prize

San Diego Asian Film Festival

 Best Narrative Feature

References

External links
 
 

2010 films
2010s Japanese-language films
2010s English-language films
American drama films
2010s American films